Poha or POHA may refer to:

 Poha (rice), flattened rice originating from the Indian subcontinent
 Pohay, breakfast dish made from flattened rice
 Pōhā, a traditional Māori bag made from southern kelp
 Physalis peruviana (Cape gooseberry), species of plant
 Protection from Harassment Act 1997, United Kingdom.
 Protection from Harassment Act 2014, Singapore.